Marko Marović (Serbian Cyrillic: Марко Маровић; born 30 January 1983) is a Serbian former professional footballer who played as a defender.

Club career
Marović started out at Partizan, signing his first professional contract with the club in June 2001. He failed to make any competitive appearance for the first team, being loaned out to Teleoptik, Rad, Obilić, and Radnički Pirot. In early 2008, Marović moved to Serbian SuperLiga club Čukarički. The following season he went abroad to play in the Liga I with CS Gaz Metan Mediaș. After a season in Romania he went to the Caucasus region to play in the Erovnuli Liga with FC Dinamo Tbilisi.

He returned to Europe to play in the Nemzeti Bajnokság I with Pécsi MFC, and ACS Poli Timișoara. In 2016, he went overseas to Canada to play with the Serbian White Eagles in the Canadian Soccer League. In his debut season in Toronto he won the CSL Championship after defeating Hamilton City SC by a score of 2-1.

International career
Marović represented FR Yugoslavia at under-16 and under-19 level in UEFA competitions.

References

External links
 HLSZ profile
 
 
 

ACS Poli Timișoara players
Association football defenders
Canadian Soccer League (1998–present) players
CS Gaz Metan Mediaș players
Expatriate footballers in Georgia (country)
Expatriate footballers in Hungary
Expatriate footballers in Romania
Expatriate soccer players in Canada
FC Dinamo Tbilisi players
First League of Serbia and Montenegro players
FK Čukarički players
FK Obilić players
FK Partizan players
FK Rad players
FK Radnički Pirot players
FK Teleoptik players
Liga I players
Liga II players
Nemzeti Bajnokság I players
Pécsi MFC players
Serbian expatriate footballers
Serbian expatriate sportspeople in Canada
Serbian expatriate sportspeople in Georgia (country)
Serbian expatriate sportspeople in Hungary
Serbian expatriate sportspeople in Romania
Serbian First League players
Serbian footballers
Serbian SuperLiga players
Serbian White Eagles FC players
Footballers from Belgrade
1983 births
Living people